Nigora Tursunkulova (born 4 April 1999) is an Uzbekistani taekwondo athlete.

She represented Uzbekistan at the 2016 Summer Olympics in Rio de Janeiro, in the women's 67 kg.

References

External links

1999 births
Living people
Uzbekistani female taekwondo practitioners
Olympic taekwondo practitioners of Uzbekistan
Taekwondo practitioners at the 2016 Summer Olympics
Taekwondo practitioners at the 2018 Asian Games
Asian Games medalists in taekwondo
Asian Games bronze medalists for Uzbekistan
Medalists at the 2018 Asian Games
Asian Taekwondo Championships medalists
Taekwondo practitioners at the 2020 Summer Olympics
21st-century Uzbekistani women